Radio Gaalkacyo is a radio station based in Galkayo, Somalia.

Overview
It has an associated website written in Somali and in English, presenting news and current events.

Formerly known as Radio Free Somalia, Radio Gaalkacyo currently counts 50,000 daily visitors to its website. It also has approximately 950,000 listeners on FM radio based in Galkayo and Garowe in the northeastern Puntland region, with a reach of more than 250 km2.

See also
Media of Somalia
Radio Garowe
Radio Laascaanood
Radio Mogadishu
Radio Daljir

References

External links
(Somali)  Radio Gaalkacyo official site1
Radio Gaalkacyo official site2

Radio stations in Somalia
Somali-language radio stations
Mass media in Galkayo